Marlene Lynch Ford (born February 23, 1954) is an American Democratic Party politician, prosecutor and jurist who served in the New Jersey General Assembly.

Born Marlene Lynch in Yuma, Arizona on February 23, 1954, she attended St. Rose High School in Belmar, New Jersey. She graduated in 1976 from Georgian Court College with a bachelor's degree in history and was awarded a J.D. degree from Seton Hall University Law School in 1979. She married William J. Ford in 1974.  Divorced in 1989. Married Francis J Kelly MD in 1998 

A resident of Point Pleasant, she was elected to the State Assembly in 1983, defeating freshman Republican Assemblyman Warren Wolf.  She was the youngest woman at 29 to be elected to the General Assembly. She was defeated for re-election in 1985 by Republican Robert Singer, but regained her seat in a 1989 rematch with Singer.  She lost her seat again in the 1991 Republican landslide.

In August 1985, Governor of New Jersey Thomas Kean signed into law a bill sponsored by Ford that allowed residents to deduct property taxes paid from their income tax gross income calculation, resulting in cuts of $60 to $140 on their state taxes. It was at the time the largest tax cut in New Jersey history.
In 1992 she was appointed to the Superior Court by Governor James Florio and reappointed with tenure in 1999. 
Governor Jon Corzine appointed Ford to serve as Ocean County Prosecutor in 2007 and Governor Chris Christie appointed her to serve as a judge on the New Jersey Superior Court in 2013. A resident of Toms River, she was elevated to Assignment Judge (Chief Judge) of Ocean County in 2015.

References

1954 births
Living people
Georgian Court University alumni
Seton Hall University School of Law alumni
Women state legislators in New Jersey
Democratic Party members of the New Jersey General Assembly
New Jersey lawyers
New Jersey state court judges
People from Point Pleasant, New Jersey
People from Toms River, New Jersey
People from Yuma, Arizona
Politicians from Ocean County, New Jersey
St. Rose High School alumni
21st-century American women